runDisney (stylized as runDisney, formerly Disney Endurance Series and The Endurance Series at Walt Disney World Resort), is the road race division of Disney Sports Enterprises, a unit of Disney Parks, Experiences and Products, a segment and subsidiary of The Walt Disney Company. The division is designed to get runners to plan a "runcation", a vacation planned to coincide with the race they signed up for.

runDisney consists of 26 individual races with 163,000 runners.

History 
In 1994, Disney held the Walt Disney World Marathon, its first road race while adding addition races later. There were only 5,588 runners at this inaugural race of what became the Disney Endurance Series.

Disneyland Marathon and 5K were run in 1995 three weeks after the LA Marathon on March 26, 1995. The marathon included Anaheim Stadium and a loop around The Pond of Anaheim, while its 5K stuck to Disneyland taking in six of seven of the theme lands.

By 1998, Williams was named vice president of Disney Sports Attractions, overseeing a newly created sports & recreation division including its races. In 1998, the first Donald Half Marathon is run at the same day as the WDW Marathon. The first 10K Disney Classic race on October 3, 1999 kicked off Disney World's 15-month Millennium Celebration.

On March 30, 2003, Sports Attractions held the first Disney Inline Marathon at the request of the International Inline Skating Association. By 2005, a half marathon was added to this weekend.

In 2004, Florida Half-Ironman Triathlon and Family Festival was started by Ironman North America and Disney Sports Attraction and was scheduled only for two years. The festival was held May 22 to 23 which include the Florida Half-Ironman, a Kids Race, and an expo.

Disney's 10K Classic was renamed the Race for the Taste 10K in 2005 and moved to October 9 to coincide with the Epcot International Food and Wine Festival, which then ran from September 30 to November 13. The Race for the Cure 5K was scheduled for October 8 with proceeds benefiting the Susan G. Komen Breast Foundation while Disney's Cross Country Classic was scheduled on the seventh.

In 2006, the Goofy race challenge was inaugurated as the half and marathon were scheduled for separated days for the first time at the World Weekend. 3,000 runners applied for the challenge. By that year, a Fun Run 5K and Kids’ Races were added on Saturday, while a Health and Fitness Expo was held Thursday to Friday at Disney's Wide World of Sports Complex.

From May 5 to 7, 2006, the inaugural Disney Minnie Marathon Weekend was held but no race was a marathon. The Champion 5K and Fun Runs were added to the ESPN the Weekend at Disney's Hollywood Studios in 2009. The first Wine & Dine Half-Marathon was run in 2010.

The 2014 World Marathon Weekend added the Walt Disney World 10K plus the Dopey Challenge for completing all four weekend races. An additional race, Castaway Cay Challenge, was added to the weekend series in 2015 with the 5K race taking place on Disney Cruise Line's Castaway Cay. The first international runDisney weekend was Disneyland Paris Half Marathon in September 2016.

In September 2016 Disneyland Resort Paris held its first races at the DLP Val d’ Europe Half-Marathon.

RunDisney canceled all Disneyland Resort based races beginning in 2018 due to major ongoing construction projects (e.g. Star Wars: Galaxy's Edge, the Disneyland Eastern Gateway and a new Downtown Disney hotel). The Theme Park Insider blog speculated that Disney may be using the loss of revenue to the City of Anaheim and nearby business as leverage to expedite project approval.

In the 2017 Disney Wine & Dine Half Marathon, which took place on November 5, 2017, a runner collapsed and died near the finish line in the Epcot parking lot. No other details were initially disclosed.

In 2020, due to the ongoing COVID-19 pandemic, the Star Wars Rival Run Weekend was cancelled, while the Wine & Dine Half Marathon Weekend was changed to a virtual race weekend. On September 22, 2020, it was announced that both the 2021 Walt Disney World Marathon and the 2021 Princess Half Marathon Weekends would become virtual as well.

On June 30, 2021, it was announced that in-person racing would return to Walt Disney World, beginning with the Wine & Dine Weekend in November. Some modifications may be made due to COVID.

On September 11, 2022, during D23 Expo, it was revealed that runDisney races would return to Disneyland in 2024.

Weekend series

Races

Race for the Taste
The Race for the Taste, formerly Disney Classic, was a 10K route that started at Disney's Wide World of Sports Complex, then went through Disney-MGM Studios' new attraction, Lights, Motors, Action! Extreme Stunt Show, then went along Disney's Yacht and Beach Club Resorts, and finished at the World Showcase in Epcot, where the Food and Wine Festival is taking place. A ceremonial toast kicked off the race while music and entertainment lined the route. Runners were required to maintain a 15-minute mile.

Athletes enjoyed a ceremonial toast to start the race. During the run, participants were entertained by festive music and entertainment. A "Go the Distance" Expo was held October 7–8 which in 2005 had a special wine debut, Miles of Magic, a California Syrah wine.

Race Challenges 
Earn additional medals for completing multiple races.
Disney Princess Half Marathon Weekend
Fairy Tale Challenge: run the 10K and half marathon
Walt Disney World Weekend
 Goofy Challenge (2006-): run the half and full marathons
 Dopey Challenge (2014-): run all four Disney World weekend races
Disneyland Half-Marathon Weekend
 Dumbo Double Dare (2013—) running the 10K and the half marathon
 Coast-to-Coast: run a half marathon in Orlando and in Anaheim in a single calendar year
Disneyland Paris (DLP) Half Marathon Weekend
 Castle to Chateau Challenge (2016-) in the same calendar year run one of the half marathon at Disneyland, the halfmarathon at Walt Disney World or the marathon at Walt Disney World plus run the half marathon at Disneyland Paris 
Bibbidi Bobbidi Boo Cinderella (2017-) run both Paris 10K and a half marathon races
Wine & Dine Half Marathon
 Disney Two Course Challenge

References

External links
, official website

Road running competitions in the United States
Sports in Orlando, Florida
Disney sports